The following lists events that happened during 1990 in Albania.

Events
December 9 - Student demonstrators of Enver Hoxha University in Tirana march through the streets of the capital demanding an end to dictatorship, following radical reforms elsewhere in Eastern Europe.
December 11 - The number of protesters reach nearly 3,000. The Thirteenth Plenum of the Albanian Party of Labor (APL) Central Committee is announced for February 1991.
December 12 - The first opposition party of Albania, the Albanian Democratic Party (ADP) is formed.

Births

 Andi Hasa
 Ansi Nika
 Ardit Shehaj
 Arsen Sykaj
 Asion Daja
 Besart Abdurahimi
 Blerti Hajdari
 Brunild Pepa
 Erbi Ago
 Florian Berisha
 Gers Delia
 Indrit Hithi
 Kështjella Pepshi
 Marigona Dragusha
 Odeon Bërdufi
 Orhan Mustafi
 Renaldo Rama
 Rita Ora
 Roland Peqini
 Sokol Cikalleshi
 Stivi Frasheri
 Sulejman Hoxha, footballer

Deaths
Rahman Morina, Kosovo police officer and political figure of Albanian descent

See also
 Years in Albania
 2007 in Albania
 2011 in Albania

References